Edward Albert Francis (born 11 September 1999) is an English footballer who plays for National League side Notts County as a midfielder.

Club career
Francis was born in Poynton and came through the academy system at Manchester City, joining them in the under-6 year-group. He captained the club's under-18 side in the final of the 2016–17 FA Youth Cup final against Chelsea, standing in for Joel Latibeaudiere, which City lost 6–2 on aggregate.

Having graduated from the academy in summer 2018, Francis joined Dutch Eerste Divisie side Almere City on loan for the 2018–19 season. During his time there he played predominantly for their development side, Jong Almere City, in the Tweede Divisie.

Francis was signed by Premier League side Wolverhampton Wanderers in January 2019 for an undisclosed fee. He signed a two-and-a-half-year with the option of a further year. On 18 February 2020, he was loaned out to Swiss club Grasshopper Club Zürich until the end of the season.

On 15 December 2020, Francis signed for EFL League Two side Harrogate Town.

On 20 July 2021, Francis joined National League side Notts County on a two-year deal.

Career statistics

Club

References

1999 births
Living people
English footballers
England youth international footballers
English expatriate footballers
Association football defenders
Manchester City F.C. players
Almere City FC players
Wolverhampton Wanderers F.C. players
Grasshopper Club Zürich players
Harrogate Town A.F.C. players
Notts County F.C. players
Tweede Divisie players
Eerste Divisie players
English Football League players
English expatriate sportspeople in the Netherlands
English expatriate sportspeople in Switzerland
Expatriate footballers in the Netherlands
Expatriate footballers in Switzerland